The Martyrdom of St Stephen is a c.1603-1604 oil on canvas painting by Annibale Carracci. It was given to Louis XIV by the duc de Montausier sometime before 1668 and is now in the Louvre in Paris (INV. 204). It is drawn on by a c.1610 work on the subject possibly by the artist's nephew Antonio Carracci (National Gallery, London).

References

1604 paintings
Paintings by Annibale Carracci
Paintings in the Louvre by Italian artists
Paintings of Saint Stephen